Willard Merrill "Pete" Pederson (October 28, 1910 – September 8, 1982) was an American college football and college basketball coach as well as a professional basketball player. Professionally, he played in the National Basketball League for the Oshkosh All-Stars and Toledo Jim White Chevrolets and averaged 3.1 points per game for his career. In 1939–40 he served as player-coach for the All-Stars before resuming full-time head coaching duties in 1940–41. His collegiate basketball coaching experience includes a stint at his alma mater, Western State College of Colorado—now known as Western Colorado University, from 1935 to 1939.

Pederson played football at Western State in addition to basketball. In his post-professional basketball life, he became the head football coach for University of Mount Union, Marshall University, and Western State.

Head coaching record

College football

References

1910 births
1982 deaths
American men's basketball players
Centers (basketball)
Forwards (basketball)
Marshall Thundering Herd football coaches
Mount Union Purple Raiders football coaches
Mount Union Purple Raiders men's basketball coaches
Oshkosh All-Stars players
Toledo Jim White Chevrolets players
Western Colorado Mountaineers football coaches
Western Colorado Mountaineers football players
Western Colorado Mountaineers men's basketball coaches
Western Colorado Mountaineers men's basketball players
United States Navy personnel of World War II
Recipients of the Silver Star
Sportspeople from Pueblo, Colorado
People from San Luis Obispo County, California
Coaches of American football from Colorado
Players of American football from Colorado
Basketball coaches from Colorado
Basketball players from Colorado